Winchlor is a brand of calcium hypochlorite, which is a yellow white solid which has a strong smell of chlorine. It is highly soluble in water and is more preferably used in soft to medium-hard water. It has two forms: dry and hydrated. The hydrated form is safer to handle. The brand originally came from an industrial company which decided to cancel the distribution of calcium hypochlorite in 2010. Winchlor is a brand of chlorine that has been used by many water districts in the Philippines. The Alpha Enterprise located in Cabuyao Laguna is the company who has started the product development of Winchlor which is manufactured by Hydrochemical USA. The selling point of the product is its easy dissolution property. The packaging of the product is usually 45 kilograms net and 43 kilogram net; the weight of the product will depend on the requirement of the client. This product has more than 70% chlorine concentration. The latest test was 78% chlorine content tested in University of the Philippines BIOTECH and Philippine Institute of Pure and Applied Chemistry (PIPAC).This product brand has been registered to the Intellectual Property Office with registration number: 4/201700502231. This was done to stop other companies from faking the said brand.

References 

Bleaches